Christian monasticism is the devotional practice of Christians who live ascetic and typically cloistered lives that are dedicated to Christian worship. It began to develop early in the history of the Christian Church, modeled upon scriptural examples and ideals, including those in the Old Testament, but was not mandated as an institution in the scriptures. It has come to be regulated by religious rules (e. g. the Rule of Saint Augustine, Anthony the Great, St Pachomius, the Rule of St Basil, the Rule of St Benedict,) and, in modern times, the Canon law of the respective Christian denominations that have forms of monastic living. Those living the monastic life are known by the generic terms monks (men) and nuns (women). The word monk originated from the Greek  ('monk'), itself from  meaning  'alone'.

Christian monks did not live in monasteries at first, rather, they began by living alone as solitaries, as the word  might suggest. As more people took on the lives of monks, living alone in the wilderness, they started to come together and model themselves after the original monks nearby. Quickly, the monks formed communities to further their ability to observe an ascetic life. According to Christianity historian Robert Louis Wilken, "By creating an alternate social structure within the Church they laid the foundations for one of the most enduring Christian institutions..." Monastics generally dwell in a monastery, whether they live there in a community (cenobites), or in seclusion (recluses).

Life for monks and nuns

The basic idea of monasticism in all its varieties is seclusion or withdrawal from the world or society. Monastic life is distinct from the "religious orders" such as the friars, canons regular, clerks regular, and the more recent religious congregations. The latter has essentially some special work or aim, such as preaching, teaching, liberating captives, etc., which occupies a large place in their activities. While monks have undertaken labors of the most varied character, in every case this work is extrinsic to the essence of the monastic state. Monks and friars are two distinct roles. In the thirteenth century "...new orders of friars were founded to teach the Christian faith," because monasteries had declined.

Both ways of living out the Christian life are regulated by the respective church law of those Christian denominations that recognize it (e.g., the Roman Catholic Church, the Eastern Orthodox Church, the Anglican Church, or the Lutheran Church). Christian monastic life does not always involve communal living with like-minded Christians.  Christian monasticism has varied greatly in its external forms, but, broadly speaking, it has two main types: (a) the eremitical or secluded, (b) the cenobitical or city life. St. Anthony the Abbot may be called the founder of the first and St. Pachomius of the second. The monastic life is based on Jesus's amen to "be perfect, therefore, as your heavenly Father is perfect" (Matthew 5:48). This ideal, also called the state of perfection, can be seen, for example, in the Philokalia, a book of monastic writings. Their manner of self-renunciation has three elements corresponding to the three evangelical counsels: poverty, chastity and obedience.

History

Biblical precedent
First-century groups such as the Essenes and the Therapeutae followed lifestyles that could be seen as precursors to Christian monasticism. Early Christian monasticism drew its inspiration from the examples of the Prophet Elijah and John the Baptist, who both lived alone in the desert, and above all from the story of Jesus' time in solitary struggle with Satan in the desert, before his public ministry.
Another monastic precedent in Bible would be Nazirites as they practiced tonsure, followed a certain diet as a form of fasting, lived consecrated lifes  and they followed a certain practice concerning hygiene. However, case of Nazirites is usually defined as a form of a historical Jewish vow or oath instead of being a direct precedent of monastic orders because of the historical context concerning Israelites and the importance of private rituals concerning vow making in historical Israelite religion.

Early Christianity

Early Christian ascetics have left no confirmed archaeological traces and only hints in the written record. Communities of virgins who had consecrated themselves to Christ are found at least as far back as the 2nd century. There were also individual ascetics, known as the "devout", who usually lived not in the deserts but on the edge of inhabited places, still remaining in the world but practicing asceticism and striving for union with God. In ante-Nicene ascetics a man would lead a single life, practice long and frequent fasts, abstain from meat and wine, and support himself, if he were able, by some small handicraft, keeping of what he earned only so much as was absolutely necessary for his own sustenance, and giving the rest to the poor.

An early form of "proto-monasticism" appeared as well in the 3rd century among Syriac Christians through the "Sons of the covenant" movement. Eastern Orthodoxy looks to Basil of Caesarea as a founding monastic legislator, as well to as the example of the Desert Fathers.

Eremitic Monasticism

Eremitic monasticism, or solitary monasticism, is characterized by a complete withdrawal from society. The word 'eremitic' comes from the Greek word eremos which means desert. This name was given because of St. Anthony of Egypt, who left civilization behind to live on a solitary Egyptian mountain in the third century. Though he was probably not the first Christian hermit, he is recognized as such as he was the first known one.

Paul the Hermit is the first Christian historically known to have been living as a monk. In the 3rd century, Anthony of Egypt (252–356) lived as a hermit in the desert and gradually gained followers who lived as hermits nearby but not in actual community with him. This type of monasticism is called eremitical or "hermit-like".

Another option for becoming a solitary monastic was to become an anchoress/anchorite. This began because there were persons who wanted to live the solitary lifestyle but were not able to live alone in the wild. Thus they would go to the Bishop for permission who would then perform the rite of enclosure. After this was completed the anchoress would live alone in a room that typically had a window that opened into a church so they could receive communion and participate in church services. There were two other windows that allowed food to be passed in and people to come to seek advice. The most well known anchoress was Julian of Norwich who was born in England in 1342.

Cenobitic monasticism

While the earliest Desert Fathers lived as hermits, they were rarely completely isolated, but often lived in proximity to one another, and soon loose-knit communities began to form in such places as the Desert of Nitria and the Desert of Skete. Saint Macarius established individual groups of cells such as those at Kellia, founded in 328. These monks were anchorites, following the monastic ideal of St. Anthony. They lived by themselves, gathering together for common worship on Saturdays and Sundays only.

In 346 St Pachomius established in Egypt the first cenobitic Christian monastery. At Tabenna in Upper Egypt, sometime around 323 AD, Pachomius decided to mold his disciples into a more organized community in which the monks lived in individual huts or rooms (cellula in Latin,) but worked, ate, and worshipped in shared space. The intention was to bring together individual ascetics who, although pious, did not, like Saint Anthony, have the physical ability or skills to live a solitary existence in the desert. This method of monastic organization is called cenobitic or "communal". In Catholic theology, this community-based living is considered superior because of the obedience practiced and the accountability offered. The head of a monastery came to be known by the word for "Father"—in Syriac, Abba; in English, "Abbot".

Guidelines for daily life were created, and separate monasteries were created for men and women. St Pachomius introduced a monastic Rule of cenobitic life, giving everyone the same food and attire. The monks of the monastery fulfilled the obediences assigned them for the common good of the monastery. Among the various obediences was copying books. St Pachomius considered that an obedience fulfilled with zeal was greater than fasting or prayer.

A Pachomian monastery was a collection of buildings surrounded by a wall. The monks were distributed in houses, each house containing about forty monks. There would be thirty to forty houses in a monastery. There was an abbot over each monastery and provosts with subordinate officials over each house. The monks were divided into houses according to the work they were employed in: thus there would be a house for carpenters, a house for agriculturists, and so forth. But other principles of division seem to have been employed, e.g., there was a house for the Greeks. On Saturdays and Sundays, all the monks assembled in the church for Mass; on other days the Office and other spiritual exercises were celebrated in the houses.

From a secular point of view, a monastery was an industrial community in which almost every kind of trade was practised. This, of course, involved much buying and selling, so the monks had ships of their own on the Nile, which conveyed their agricultural produce and manufactured goods to the market and brought back what the monasteries required. From the spiritual point of view, the Pachomian monk was a religious living under a rule.

The community of Pachomius was so successful he was called upon to help organize others, and by one count by the time he died in 346 there were thought to be 3,000 such communities dotting Egypt, especially in the Thebaid. From there monasticism quickly spread out first to Palestine and the Judean Desert, Syria, North Africa and eventually the rest of the Roman Empire.

In 370 Basil the Great, monastic founder in Cappadocia, became bishop of Caesarea and wrote principles of ascetic life. Eastern monastic teachings were brought to the western church by Saint John Cassian (c. 360 – c. 435).  As a young adult, he and his friend Germanus entered a monastery in Palestine but then journeyed to Egypt to visit the eremitic groups in Nitria. Many years later, Cassian founded a monastery of monks and probably also one of nuns near Marseilles. He wrote two long works, the Institutes and Conferences. In these books, he not only transmitted his Egyptian experience but also gave Christian monasticism a profound evangelical and theological basis.

At the time of his conversion in Milan in the years 386–387, Augustine was aware of the life of Saint Anthony in the desert of Egypt. Upon his return to Africa as a Christian in the year 388, however, Augustine and a few Christian friends founded at Thagaste a lay community. They became cenobites in the countryside rather than in the desert.

Saint Benedict (c. 480 – 547 AD) lived for many years as a hermit in a cave near Subiaco, Italy. He was asked to be head over several monks who wished to change to the monastic style of Pachomius by living in the community. Between the years 530 and 560, he wrote the Rule of Saint Benedict as a guideline for monks living in community.

Scholars such as Lester K. Little attribute the rise of monasticism at this time to the immense changes in the church brought about by Constantine's legalization of Christianity. The subsequent transformation of Christianity into the main Roman religion ended the position of Christians as a minority sect. In response, a new form of dedication was developed. The long-term "martyrdom" of the ascetic replaced the violent physical martyrdom of the persecutions.

Opposition 

In the early church, there were also opponents of Monasticism, among the first opponents to Monasticism were Helvidius, Jovinian, Vigilantius and Aerius of Sebaste. Most of them were attacked by Jerome who defended monastic and ascetic ideas. Jovinian was the most influential opponent of monasticism, he wrote a work in the year 390, which is now lost, which attacked monasticism and its ethical principles.  Monasticism was also opposed by some Arians.

Eastern Christian monasticism

 
Orthodox monasticism does not have religious orders as in the West, so there are no formal Monastic Rules (Regulae); rather, each monk and nun is encouraged to read all of the Holy Fathers and emulate their virtues. There is also no division between the "active" and "contemplative" life. Orthodox monastic life embraces both active and contemplative aspects.

Within the Eastern Orthodox Church, there exist three types of monasticism: eremitic, cenobitic, and the skete. The skete is a very small community, often of two or three, under the direction of an Elder. They pray privately for most of the week, then come together on Sundays and Feast Days for communal prayer, thus combining aspects of both eremitic and coenobitic monasticism.

Historical development
Even before Saint Anthony the Great (the "father of monasticism") went out into the desert, there were Christians who devoted their lives to ascetic discipline and striving to lead an evangelical life (i.e., in accordance with the teachings of the Gospel).
As monasticism spread in the East from the hermits living in the deserts of Egypt to Palestine, Syria, and on up into Asia Minor and beyond, the sayings (apophthegmata) and acts (praxeis) of the Desert Fathers and Desert Mothers came to be recorded and circulated, first among their fellow monastics and then among the laity as well.

Among these earliest recorded accounts was the Paradise, by Palladius of Galatia, Bishop of Helenopolis (also known as the Lausiac History, after the prefect Lausus, to whom it was addressed). Saint Athanasius of Alexandria (whose Life of Saint Anthony the Great set the pattern for monastic hagiography), Saint Jerome, and other anonymous compilers were also responsible for setting down very influential accounts. Also of great importance are the writings surrounding the communities founded by Saint Pachomius, the father of cenobiticism, and his disciple Saint Theodore, the founder of the skete form of monasticism.

Among the first to set forth precepts for the monastic life was Saint Basil the Great, a man from a professional family who was educated in Caesarea, Constantinople, and Athens. Saint Basil visited colonies of hermits in Palestine and Egypt but was most strongly impressed by the organized communities developed under the guidance of Saint Pachomius. Saint Basil's ascetical writings set forth standards for well-disciplined community life and offered lessons in what became the ideal monastic virtue: humility.

Saint Basil wrote a series of guides for monastic life (the Lesser Asketikon the Greater Asketikon the Morals, etc.) which, while not "Rules" in the legalistic sense of later Western rules, provided firm indications of the importance of a single community of monks, living under the same roof, and under the guidance—and even discipline—of a strong abbot. His teachings set the model for Greek and Russian monasticism but had less influence in the Latin West.

Of great importance to the development of monasticism is the Saint Catherine's Monastery on Mount Sinai in Egypt. Here the Ladder of Divine Ascent was written by Saint John Climacus (c.600), a work of such importance that many Orthodox monasteries to this day read it publicly either during the Divine Services or in Trapeza during Great Lent.

At the height of the East Roman Empire, numerous great monasteries were established by the emperors, including the twenty "sovereign monasteries" on the Holy Mountain, an actual "monastic republic" wherein the entire country is devoted to bringing souls closer to God. In this milieu, the Philokalia was compiled.

As the Great Schism between East and West grew, conflict arose over misunderstandings about Hesychasm. Saint Gregory Palamas, bishop of Thessalonica, an experienced Athonite monk, defended Eastern Orthodox spirituality against the critiques of Barlaam of Calabria, and left numerous important works on the spiritual life.

Present
Christian monasticism was and continued to be a lay condition—monks depended on a local parish church for the sacraments. However, if the monastery was isolated in the desert, as were many of the Egyptian examples, that inconvenience compelled monasteries either to take in priest members, to have their abbot or other members ordained. A priest-monk is sometimes called a hieromonk. In many cases in Eastern Orthodoxy, when a bishopric needed to be filled, they would look to nearby monasteries to find suitable candidates, being good sources of men who were spiritually mature and generally possessing the other qualities desired in a bishop. Eventually, among the Eastern Orthodox Churches, it became established by canon law that all bishops must be monks.

Monastic centers thrive to this day in Bulgaria, Ethiopia, Georgia, Greece, North Macedonia, Russia, Romania, Serbia, the Holy Land, and elsewhere in the Orthodox world, the Autonomous Monastic State of Mount Athos remaining the spiritual center of monasticism for the Eastern Orthodox Church. Since the fall of the Iron Curtain, a great renaissance of monasticism has occurred, and many previously empty or destroyed monastic communities have been reopened.

Monasticism continues to be very influential in the Eastern Orthodox Church. According to the Sacred Canons, all Bishops must be monks (not merely celibate), and feast days to Glorified monastic saints are an important part of the liturgical tradition of the church. Fasting, Hesychasm, and the pursuit of the spiritual life are strongly encouraged not only among monastics but also among the laity.

Types of monks

There are also three levels of monks: The Rassophore, the Stavrophore, and the Schema-Monk (or Schema-Nun). Each of the three degrees represents an increased level of asceticism. In the early days of monasticism, there was only one level—the Great Schema—and even Saint Theodore the Studite argued against the establishment of intermediate grades, but nonetheless the consensus of the church has favored the development of three distinct levels.

When a candidate wishes to embrace the monastic life, he will enter the monastery of his choice as a guest and ask to be received by the Hegumen (Abbot). After a period of at least three days the Hegumen may at his discretion clothe the candidate as a novice. There is no formal ceremony for the clothing of a novice; he (or she) would simply be given the Podraznik, belt and skoufos.

After a period of about three years, the Hegumen may at his discretion tonsure the novice as a Rassophore monk, giving him the outer garment called the Rassa (Greek: Rason). A monk (or nun) may remain in this grade all the rest of his life, if he so chooses. But the Rite of Tonsure for the Rassophore refers to the grade as that of the "Beginner", so it is intended that the monk will advance on to the next level. The Rassophore is also given a klobuk which he wears in church and on formal occasions. In addition, Rassophores will be given a prayer rope at their tonsure.

The next rank, Stavrophore, is the grade that most Russian monks remain all their lives. The title Stavrophore means "cross-bearer" because when Tonsured into this grade the monastic is given a cross to wear at all times. This cross is called a Paramand—a wooden cross attached by ribbons to a square cloth embroidered with the Instruments of the Passion and the words, "I bear upon my body the marks of the Lord Jesus". The Paramand is so-called because it is worn under the Mantle (Greek: Mandyas; Church Slavonic: Mantya), which is a long cape which completely covers the monk from neck to foot. Among the Russians, Stavrophores are also informally referred to as "mantle monks". At his Tonsure, a Stavrophore is given a wooden hand cross and a lit candle, as well as a prayer rope.

The highest rank of monasticism is the Great Schema (Greek: Megaloschemos; Church Slavonic: Schimnik). Attaining the level of Schema monk is much more common among the Greeks than it is among the Russians, for whom it is normally reserved to hermits, or to very advanced monastics. The Schema monk or Schema nun wears the same habit as the Rassophore, but to it is added the Analavos (Church Slavonic: Analav), a garment shaped like a cross, covering the shoulders and coming down to the knees (or lower) in front and in back. This garment is roughly reminiscent of the scapular worn by some Roman Catholic orders, but it is finely embroidered with the Cross and instruments of the Passion (see illustration, above). The Klobuk worn by a Schema monk is also embroidered with a red cross and other symbols. the Klobuk may be shaped differently, more rounded at the top, in which case it is referred to as a koukoulion. The skufia worn by a Schema monk is also more intricately embroidered.

The religious habit worn by Eastern Orthodox monastics is the same for both monks and nuns, except that the nuns wear an additional veil, called an apostolnik.

The central and unifying feature of Eastern Orthodox monasticism is Hesychasm, the practice of silence, and the concentrated saying of the Jesus Prayer. All ascetic practices and monastic humility is guided towards preparing the heart for theoria or the "divine vision" that comes from the union of the soul with God. Such a union is not accomplished by any human activity. All an ascetic can do is prepare the ground; it is for God to cause the seed to grow and bear fruit.

Western Christian monasticism

History

The introduction of monasticism into the West may be dated from about A.D. 340 when St. Athanasius visited Rome accompanied by the two Egyptian monks Ammon and Isidore, disciples of St. Anthony. The publication of the "Vita Antonii" some years later and its translation into Latin spread the knowledge of Egyptian monachism widely and many were found in Italy to imitate the example thus set forth. The first Italian monks aimed at reproducing exactly what was done in Egypt and not a few—such as Saint Jerome, Rufinus, Paula, Eustochium and the two Melanias (Elder and Younger)—actually went to live in Egypt or Palestine as being better suited to monastic life than Italy.

The earliest phases of monasticism in Western Europe involved figures like Martin of Tours, who after serving in the Roman legions converted to Christianity and established a hermitage near Milan, then moved on to Poitiers where a community gathered around his hermitage. He was called to become Bishop of Tours in 372, where he established a monastery at Marmoutier on the opposite bank of the Loire, a few miles upstream from the city. His cell was a hut of wood, and round it his disciples, who soon numbered eighty, dwelt in caves and huts. His monastery was laid out as a colony of hermits rather than as a single integrated community. The type of life was simply the Antonian monachism of Egypt.

Honoratus of Marseilles was a wealthy Gallo-Roman aristocrat, who after a pilgrimage to Egypt, founded the Monastery of Lérins in 410, on an island lying off the modern city of Cannes. The monastery combined a community with isolated hermitages where older, spiritually-proven monks could live in isolation. Lérins became, in time, a center of monastic culture and learning, and many later monks and bishops would pass through Lérins in the early stages of their career. Honoratus was called to be Bishop of Arles.

John Cassian began his monastic career at a monastery in Palestine and Egypt around 385 to study monastic practice there. In Egypt, he had been attracted to the isolated life of hermits, which he considered the highest form of monasticism, yet the monasteries he founded were all organized monastic communities. About 415 he established two monasteries near Marseilles, one for men, one for women. In time these attracted a total of 5,000 monks and nuns. Most significant for the future development of monasticism were Cassian's Institutes, which provided a guide for monastic life and his Conferences, a collection of spiritual reflections.

Celtic monasticism
It seems that the first Celtic monasteries were merely settlements where the Christians lived together—priests and laity, men, women, and children alike—as a kind of religious clan. According to James F. Kenney, every important church was a monastic establishment, with a small walled village of monks and nuns living under ecclesiastical discipline, and ministering to the people of the surrounding area. Monastic spirituality came to Britain and then Ireland from Gaul, by way of Lérins, Tours, and Auxerre. Its spirituality was heavily influenced by the Desert Fathers, with a monastic enclosure surrounding a collection of individual monastic cells. The British church employed an episcopal structure corresponding closely to the model used elsewhere in the Christian world. Illtud, David, Gildas, and Deiniol were leading figures in 6th-century Britain.

According to Thomas O'Loughlin, "Each monastery should be seen, as with most monasteries of the period, as an individual response to the monastic impulse by someone who had experienced monasticism and then went off to establish either a hermitage to which others later came or a cenobitic community." The monasteries were organized on a family basis. Next in importance to the abbot was the scribe, in charge of the scriptorium, the teaching function of the monastery, and the keeping of the annals. The role of scribe was often a path to the position of abbot. Hereditary right and relationship to the abbot were factors influencing appointment to monastic offices.

Buildings would generally have been of wood, wattle, and thatch. Monasteries tended to be cenobitical in that monks lived in separate cells but came together for common prayer, meals, and other functions. Celtic monasticism was characterized by a rigorous asceticism and a love for learning.

Some more austere ascetics became hermits living in remote locations in what came to be called the "green martyrdom".

Women's communities 

Women's communities were normally much smaller and poorer. The nuns had to do everything themselves unless they had a couple of tenant-farmers to supply food, or pious who made donations. They spun and wove, kept their huts clean, milked their cows, and made their own meals, which could be meager.

Double monasteries 
The monastery of Brigit of Kildare at Kildare, Ireland, was a double monastery, with both men and women, supervised by an Abbess, a pattern found in other monastic foundations.

Scotland 
Around 397, Ninian, a Briton probably from the area south of the Firth of Clyde, dedicated his church at Whithorn to St. Martin of Tours. According to Bede, Ninian evangelized the southern Picts.

Kentigern was an apostle of the British Kingdom of Strathclyde in the late 6th century and the founder and patron saint of the city of Glasgow. Due to anti-Christian sentiment, he re-located for a time to Wales, where he established a monastery at St. Asaph's. Here he divided the monks into three groups. The unlettered was assigned to the duty of agriculture, the care of cattle, and the other necessary duties outside the monastery. The remaining monks, who were lettered, he appointed to the celebration of divine service in church by day and by night.

Wales 
Cadoc founded Llancarfan in the latter part of the fifth century. He received the religious habit from an Irish monk, St. Tathai, superior of a small community near Chepstow, in Monmouthshire. Returning to his native county, Cadoc built a church, and monastery, which was called Llancarfan, or the "Church of the Stags". There he also established a college and a hospital. His legend recounts that he daily fed a hundred clergy and a hundred soldiers, a hundred workmen, a hundred poor men, and the same number of widows. When thousands left the world and became monks, they very often did so as clansmen, dutifully following the example of their chief. Bishoprics, canonries, and parochial benefices passed from one to another member of the same family, and frequently from father to son. Their tribal character is a feature which Irish and Welsh monasteries had in common.

Illtyd spent the first part of his religious life as a disciple of Cadoc at Llancarfan. He founded the monastery at Llanilltyd Fawr. One of his students was Paul Aurelian, a key figure in Cornish monasticism. Gildas the Wise was also a student at Llanilltyd Fawr, as was Samson of Dol. Samson founded a monastery in an abandoned Roman fort near the river Severn and lived for a time the life of a hermit in a nearby cave before going to Brittany.

St David established his monastery on a promontory on the western sea, well placed to be a centre of Insular Christianity. His establishment became known for its austerity and holiness, more than as a centre of learning, although when King Alfred sought a scholar for his court, he summoned Asser of St David's. Contemporary with David were Teilo, Cadoc, Padarn, Beuno and Tysilio among them.

Cornwall 
Many early medieval settlements in the region were occupied by hermitage chapels which are often dedicated to St Michael as the conventional slayer of pagan demons, as at St Michael's Mount.

Ireland 

The earliest monastic settlements in Ireland emerged at the end of the fifth century. It was from Illtud and his colleagues that the Irish sought guidance on matters of ritual and discipline. Enda of Aran is called the "patriarch of Irish monasticism". A warrior prince of Oriel, upon the death of his betrothed he decided to study for the priesthood. He first joined St Ailbe at Emly, before traveling to Ninian's Candida Casa in Scotland, where he was ordained. About 484 he established the first Irish monastery at Killeaney on Aran Mor. Finnian of Clonard is said to have studied under Cadoc at Llancarfan in Glamorganshire. Finnian of Moville studied under Colman of Dromore and Mochae of Noendrum, before he too went to Candida Casa.
 
Ireland was a rural society of chieftains living in the countryside. As in Wales, if a clan chieftain accepted Christianity so did those he ruled. Commonly Irish monasteries were established by grants of land to an abbot or abbess who came from a local noble family. The monastery became the spiritual focus of the tribe or kin group. Successive abbots and abbesses were members of the founder's family, a policy which kept the monastic lands under the jurisdiction of the family (and corresponded to Irish legal tradition, which only allowed the transfer of land within a family).
In Ireland, the abbot was often called "coarb", a term designating the heir or successor of the founder.

The abbots of the principal monasteries— such as Clonard, Armagh, Clonmacnoise, Swords, etc.—were of the highest rank and held in the greatest esteem. They wielded great power and had vast influence. The abbot usually was only a presbyter, but in the large monasteries, there were one or more resident bishops who conferred orders and discharged the other functions of a bishop. The abbot was superior of the house, and all were subject to him.

The Irish rule was rigorous. It was more or less a copy of the French rule, as the French was a copy of the Thebaid. The daily routine of monastic life was prayer, study, and manual labor. With regard to food, the rule was very strict. Only one meal a day, at 3 o'clock p.m., was allowed, except on Sundays and Feast days. Wednesdays and Fridays were fast days, except the interval between Easter and Whit Sunday. The food allowed was barley bread, milk, fish, and eggs. Flesh meat was not allowed except on great feasts.

In Ireland, a distinctive form of penance developed, where confession was made privately to a priest, under the seal of secrecy, and where penance was given privately and ordinarily performed privately as well. Penance was considered therapeutic rather than punitive. Certain handbooks were made, called "penitentials", designed as a guide for confessors and as a means of regularising the penance given for each particular sin. According to Thomas Pollock Oakley, the penitential guides first developed in Wales, probably at St. David's, and spread by missions to Ireland.

Irish monasticism maintained the model of a monastic community while, like John Cassian, marking the contemplative life of the hermit as the highest form of monasticism. Saints' lives frequently tell of monks (and abbots) departing some distance from the monastery to live in isolation from the community. Irish monastic rules specify a stern life of prayer and discipline in which prayer, poverty, and obedience are the central themes.

Irish monks needed to learn Latin, the language of the Church. Thus they read Latin texts, both spiritual and secular, with an enthusiasm that their contemporaries on the continent lacked. Subjects taught included Latin, Greek, Hebrew, grammar, rhetoric, poetry, arithmetic, chronology, the Holy Places, hymns, sermons, natural science, history and especially the interpretation of Sacred Scripture. In 544 St Ciarán founded a monastery at Clonmacnoise, which became one of the most important centers of learning and religious life in Ireland.  Contrary to common practice, the title of abbot  which included the title "Comarba of Saint Ciarán"  at the community was not hereditary, which reflected the humble origins of its founder. In 557 St Brendan founded a monastery at Clonfert.

By the end of the seventh century, Irish monastic schools were attracting students from England and from Europe.

The achievements of insular art, in illuminated manuscripts like the Book of Kells, high crosses, and metalwork like the Ardagh Chalice, and in the case of manuscript decoration had a profound influence on Western medieval art. The manuscripts were produced by and for monasteries, and evidence suggests that metalwork was produced in both monastic and royal workshops.

Culdees 

The Culdees ( "Spouses of God") were members of ascetic Christian monastic and eremitical communities of Ireland, Scotland, Wales and England in the Middle Ages. Appearing first in Ireland and subsequently in Scotland, attached to cathedral or collegiate churches, they lived in monastic fashion though not taking monastic vows.

Hiberno-Scottish mission 
Irish monasticism spread widely, first to Scotland and Northern England, then to Gaul and Italy. Columba and his followers established monasteries at Bangor, on the northeastern coast of Ireland, at Iona, an island north-west of Scotland, and at Lindisfarne, which was founded by Aidan, an Irish monk from Iona, at the request of King Oswald of Northumbria. Abbots of Iona were normally appointed from the founders kin, with an abbot often naming his successor.

Columbanus, an abbot from a Leinster noble family, traveled to Gaul in the late 6th century with twelve companions. Columbanus and his followers spread the Irish model of monastic institutions to the continent. A whole series of new monastic foundations under Irish influence sprang up, starting with Columbanus's foundations of Luxeuil and Fontaine-lès-Luxeuil and, sponsored by the Frankish King Childebert II. After Childebert's death Columbanus traveled east to Metz, where Theudebert II allowed him to establish a new monastery among the semi-pagan Alemanni in what is now Switzerland. One of Columbanus's followers founded the monastery of St. Gall on the shores of Lake Constance, while Columbanus continued onward across the Alps to the kingdom of the Lombards in Italy. There King Agilulf and his wife Theodolinda granted Columbanus land in the mountains between Genoa and Milan, where he established the monastery of Bobbio. From about 698 until the reign of Charlemagne in the 770s, the Hiberno-Scottish efforts in the Frankish Empire were continued by the Anglo-Saxon mission. The rule of St. Columbanus, which was originally followed in most of these monasteries, was eventually superseded by that of St. Benedict.

Benedictine monasticism

Benedict of Nursia is the most influential of Western monks and is called "the Father of Western Monasticism". He was educated in Rome but soon sought the life of a hermit in a cave at Subiaco, outside the city.  He then attracted followers with whom he founded the monastery of Monte Cassino around 520, between Rome and Naples. He established the Rule of St Benedict, adapting in part the earlier anonymous Rule of the Master (Regula magistri), which was written somewhere south of Rome around 500, and defined the activities of the monastery, its officers, and their responsibilities. By the ninth century, largely under the inspiration of the Emperor Charlemagne, Benedict's Rule became the basic guide for Western monasticism.

While the Celtic monasteries had a stronger connection to the semi-eremitical tradition of Egypt via Lérins and Tours, Benedict and his followers were more influenced by the cenobitism of St Pachomius and Basil the Great. Early Benedictine monasteries were relatively small and consisted of an oratory, refectory, dormitory, scriptorium, guest accommodation, and out-buildings, a group of often quite separate rooms more reminiscent of a decent-sized Roman villa than a large medieval abbey. A monastery of about a dozen monks would have been normal during this period.

Medieval monastic life consisted of prayer, reading, and manual labor. Prayer was a monk's first priority. Apart from prayer, monks performed a variety of tasks, such as preparing medicine, lettering, reading, and others. Also, these monks would work in the gardens and on the land. They might also spend time in the cloister, a covered colonnade around a courtyard, where they would pray or read.  Some monasteries held a scriptorium where monks would write or copy books. When the monks wrote, they used very neat handwriting and would draw illustrations in the books and decorate the first letter of each paragraph.

The efficiency of Benedict's cenobitic Rule in addition to the stability of the monasteries made them very productive. The monasteries were the central storehouses and producers of knowledge.  Vikings started attacking Irish monasteries famous for learning in 793. One monk wrote about how he did not mind the bad weather one evening because it kept the Vikings from coming: "Bitter is the wind tonight, it tosses the ocean’s white hair, I need not fear—as on a night of calm sea—the fierce raiders from Lochlann."

In the eleventh and twelfth centuries, the growing pressure of monarchies and the nation-states undermined the wealth and power of the orders. Monasticism continued to play a role in Catholicism, but after the Protestant reformation many monasteries in Northern Europe were shut down and their assets seized.

Military orders
In the twelfth century, traditional monastic orders in Outremer evolved into military orders, initially for the purpose of defending pilgrims, although they later became larger military forces that played a key role in combating Muslim efforts at reconquest and propping up continued Christian rule in the region. These orders included the Knights Templar and the Hospitallers. In large part, the notion of military monasticism became so popular because of the advocacy of St. Bernard of Clairvaux, who believed that existing Christian methods of serving the Church's ends in the war were inadequate and that a group of dedicated warrior monks, who achieved spiritual merit and served God through waging war, was necessary. In his view, advancing the cause of Christendom was an end that justified means that might fall outside the bounds of just war. These orders largely declined with the loss of Outremer in the 1200s - except for the Teutonic Order, which transferred itself to the Baltic where it took up a major role in the Baltic Crusades.

Western Christian orders in the modern era
Many distinct monastic orders developed within Roman Catholicism and Protestantism. Monastic communities in the West, broadly speaking, are organized into orders and congregations guided by a particular religious rule, such as the Rule of St Augustine or especially Rule of St Benedict. Eastern Orthodoxy does not have a system of orders per se, though some of the Eastern Catholic Churches do.

Roman Catholicism

 Benedictines, founded in 529 by Saint Benedict at Monte Cassino, stresses manual labor in a self-sufficient monastery. They are an order of independent monastic communities.
 Cluniacs, a Benedictine movement at its height c.950-c.1130
 Camaldolese, founded c.1000 Saint Romuald of Ravenna.
 Vallombrosans, founded c. 1038 by Saint Gualberto Visdomini.
 Carthusians, also known as the Order of Saint Bruno, founded 1084 by Saint Bruno of Cologne. Open to both sexes; combines eremitical and cenobitic life.
 Cistercians, also referred to as the Order of Saint Bernard, founded in 1098 by Saint Robert of Molesme.
 Premonstratensians, also known as Norbertines, founded in 1120 by Saint Norbert of Xanten.
 Paulines, founded in Hungary in 1225 by Blessed Eusebius.
 Celestines, founded in 1244 and originally called Hermits of Saint Damiano, or Moronites (or Murronites). Became known as Celestines after their founder was elected Pope and took the name Celestine V.
 Olivetans or the Order of Our Lady of Mount Olivet, founded in 1313 by Bernardo Tolomei (born Giovanni Tolomei) along with two of his friends from the noble families of Siena, Patrizio Patrizi and Ambrogio Piccolomini.
 Bridgettines, founded in 1344 by Saint Bridget of Sweden.
 Hieronymites, founded in Spain in 1364, by an eremitic community formally known as the Order of Saint Jerome.
 Minims, officially known as the Order of Minims, founded in 1435 by Saint Francis of Paola.
 Conceptionists, formally the Order of the Immaculate Conception, founded in 1484 by Saint Beatrice of Silva.
 Turchine, formally the Order of the Most Holy Annunciation, founded in 1604 by Blessed Maria Vittoria De Fornari Strata
 Visitandines: the Order of the Visitation of Holy Mary is a Roman Catholic religious order for women. Members of the order are also known as the Salesian Sisters or as Visitation Sisters. The Order was founded in 1610 by Saint Francis de Sales and Saint Jane Frances de Chantal in Annecy, Haute-Savoie, France.
 Trappists, began c. 1664.
 Monastic Brothers and Monastic Sisters of Bethlehem, who practice Carthusian spirituality and who have been founded through the inspiration of a small group of French pilgrims on November 1, 1950, at St. Peter's Square, in the Vatican City, following the promulgation of the dogma of the Assumption of the Blessed Virgin Mary into Heaven. The Monastic Sisters were founded in France, soon after, and the Monastic Brothers in 1976.

Lutheran Church

After the foundation of the Lutheran Churches, some monasteries in Lutheran lands (such as Amelungsborn Abbey near Negenborn and Loccum Abbey in Rehburg-Loccum) and convents (such as Ebstorf Abbey near the town of Uelzen and Bursfelde Abbey in Bursfelde) adopted the Lutheran Christian faith.

Loccum Abbey and Amelungsborn Abbey have the longest traditions as Lutheran monasteries.
Since the 19th century, there has been a renewal in the monastic life among Protestants. There are many present-day Lutherans who practice the monastic teaching of the Catholic Church.

In 1947 Mother Basilea Schlink and Mother Martyria founded the Evangelical Sisterhood of Mary, in Darmstadt, Germany. This movement is largely considered Evangelical or Lutheran in its roots.

In 1948 Bavarian Lutheran pastor Walter Hümmer and his wife Hanna founded the Communität Christusbruderschaft Selbitz.

In other Lutheran traditions "The Congregation of the Servants of Christ" was established at St. Augustine's House in Oxford, Michigan, in 1958 when some other men joined Father Arthur Kreinheder in observing the monastic life and offices of prayer. These men and others came and went over the years. The community has always remained small; at times the only member was Father Arthur. During the 35 years of its existence over 25 men tested their vocations to monastic life by living at the house for some time, from a few months to many years, but at Father Arthur's death in 1989 only one permanent resident remained. At the beginning of 2006, there are two permanent professed members and two long-term guests. Strong ties remain with this community and their brothers in Sweden (Östanbäck Monastery) and in Germany the (Priory of St. Wigbert). In Germany, Communität Casteller Ring is a Lutheran Benedictine community for women.  In 2011, an Augustinian religious order, the Priestly Society of St. Augustine (Societas Sacerdotalis Sancti Augustini) was established by the Anglo-Lutheran Catholic Church.  It follows the Rule of St. Augustine, its headquarters is at Christ Lutheran Church ALCC. Kent Island, Maryland, and Fr. Jens Bargmann, PhD, is the Grand Prior.

In Lutheran Sweden, religious life for women had been established already in 1954, when Sister Marianne Nordström made her profession through contacts with The Order of the Holy Paraclete and Mother Margaret Cope (1886–1961) at St Hilda's Priory, Whitby, Yorkshire.

Anglican Communion

In England, John Wycliffe organized the Lollard Preacher Order (the "Poor Priests") to promote his views, many of which resounded with those held by the later Protestant Reformers.

Monastic life in England came to an abrupt end with Dissolution of the Monasteries during the reign of King Henry VIII. The property and lands of the monasteries were confiscated and either retained by the King, sold to landowners, or given to loyal nobility. Monks and nuns were pensioned off and retired or some were forced to either flee for the continent or to abandon their vocations. For around 300 years, there were no monastic communities within any of the Anglican churches.

Shortly after the Oxford Movement began to advocate restoring catholic faith and practice to the Church of England (see Anglo-Catholicism), there was felt to be a need for a restoration of the monastic life. Anglican priest John Henry Newman established a community of men at Littlemore near Oxford in the 1840s while he was vicar of Church of St Mary and St Nicholas, Littlemore. From then forward, there have been many communities of monks, friars, sisters, and nuns established within the Anglican Communion. In 1848, Mother Priscilla Lydia Sellon founded the Anglican Sisters of Charity and became the first woman to take religious vows within the Anglican Communion since the Reformation. In October 1850 the first building specifically built for the purpose of housing an Anglican Sisterhood was consecrated at Abbeymere in Plymouth. It housed several schools for the destitute, a laundry, a printing press, and a soup kitchen. From the 1840s and throughout the following one hundred years, religious orders for both men and women proliferated in the UK and the United States, as well as in various countries of Africa, Asia, Canada, India and the Pacific.

Some Anglican religious communities are contemplative, some active, but a distinguishing feature of the monastic life among Anglicans is that most practice the so-called "mixed life", a combination of a life of contemplative prayer with active service. Anglican religious life closely mirrors that of Roman Catholicism. Like Roman Catholic religious, Anglican religious also take the three vows of poverty, chastity, and obedience. Religious communities live together under a common rule, reciting the Divine Office and celebrating the Eucharist daily.

In the early 20th century when the Anglo-Catholic movement was at its height, the Anglican Communion had hundreds of orders and communities, and thousands of religious. However, since the 1960s there has been a sharp falling off in the numbers of religious in many parts of the Anglican Communion, most notably in the United Kingdom and the United States. Many once large and international communities have been reduced to a single convent or monastery composed of elderly men or women. In the last few decades of the 20th century, novices have for most communities been few and far between. Some orders and communities have already become extinct. There are, however, still thousands of Anglican religious working today in religious communities around the world. While vocations remain few in some areas, Anglican religious communities are experiencing exponential growth in Africa, Asia, and Oceania.

Around 1964, Reuben Archer Torrey III, an Episcopal missionary, grandson of R. A. Torrey, founded Jesus Abbey as a missionary community in Korea. It has some links with the Episcopal Church and holds an Evangelical doctrine.

Methodist Churches
In February 2001, the United Methodist Church organized the Saint Brigid of Kildare Monastery. It is a Methodist-Benedictine residential double monastery in Collegeville, Minnesota. Besides monastic orders, the Order of Saint Luke is a dispersed religious order within Methodism.

Presbyterian Churches
The Community of the Sisterhood Emmanuel was founded in 1973 in Makak - in the Centre Province by Mother Marie, one of the first female Pastors of the Presbyterian Church in Cameroon. In 1975 she moved the community to the present site- at Agyati in Bafut.  It has 10 finally consecrated Sisters, four in simple vows and a handful of others in formation.  The Sisters are trained in strong collaboration with the sister Institutes of the Catholic Church. They say that one of their charisms is ecumenism. The Sisterhood Emmanuel is the only Presbyterian Monastery in Cameroon.

Anabaptism
Anabaptist Christians "retained many elements of the monastic understanding of a 'holy life' that followed true faith". The Hutterites and Bruderhof, for example, live in intentional communities with their big houses having "ground floors for common work, meals and worship, the two-storey attics with small rooms, like monastic cells, for married couples".

Quakerism and Shakerism
The Shakers, who are also known as the "Shaking Quakers", have been characterized as a "Protestant monastic order providing refuge and otherworldly compensation". They practice a celibate and communal lifestyle, pacifism, and their model of equality of the sexes, which they institutionalized in their society in the 1780s. They are also known for their simple living, architecture, and furniture. Sincere newcomers are invited to become Shakers:

Currently, there are two remaining Shakers, Brother Arnold Hadd and Sister June Carpenter, though they hope that others will join them at the only remaining Shaker community, the Sabbathday Lake Shaker Village.

Ecumenical expressions
Christian monasticism is experiencing renewal in the form of several new foundations with an 'inter-Christian' vision for their respective communities.

In 1944 Roger Schütz, a pastor of the Swiss Reformed Church, founded a small religious brotherhood in France which became known as the Taizé Community. Although he was partly inspired by the hope of reviving monasticism in the Protestant tradition, the brotherhood was interdenominational, accepting Roman Catholic brothers, and is thus an ecumenical rather than a specifically Protestant community.

The Order of Ecumenical Franciscans is a religious order of men and women devoted to following the examples of Saint Francis of Assisi and Saint Clare of Assisi in their life and understanding of the Christian gospel: sharing a love for creation and those who have been marginalized. It includes members of many different denominations, including Catholics, Anglicans, Eastern Orthodox, and a range of Protestant traditions. The Order understands its charism to include not only ecumenical efforts and the traditional emphases of the Franciscans in general, but also to help to develop relationships between the various Franciscan orders.

Additional expressions of ecumenical monasticism can be seen in the Bose Monastic Community and communities of the New Monasticism movement arising from Protestant Evangelicalism.

Contributions

In traditional Catholic societies, monastic communities often took charge of social services such as education and healthcare. The legacy of monasteries outside remains an important current in modern society. Max Weber compared the closeted and Puritan societies of the English Dissenters, who sparked much of the industrial revolution, to monastic orders. Many Utopian thinkers (starting with Thomas More) felt inspired by the common life of monks to apply it to the whole society (an example is the phalanstère). Modern universities have also attempted to emulate Christian monasticism. Even in the Americas, universities are built in the gothic style of twelfth-century monasteries. Communal meals, dormitory residences, elaborate rituals and dress all borrow heavily from the monastic tradition. Today monasticism remains an important part of the Catholic, Eastern Orthodox and Anglican faiths.

Education
The capitulary of 789 reads: "Let every monastery and every abbey have its school, in which boys may be taught the Psalms, the system of musical notation, singing, arithmetic, and grammar". There can be no doubt that by boys are meant not only the candidates for the monastery and the wards (generally the children of nobles) committed to the care of the monks but also the children of the village or country district around the monastery, for whom there was usually an external school attached to groups of monastic buildings.

In the Middle Ages, monasteries conserved and copied ancient manuscripts in their scriptoria. A prospective monk first learned grammar, logic, and oratory. Later, he would take up mathematics, astronomy, and music. The students would use a stylus on wax. Later, when their handwriting improved, they would be given ink and parchment. Eventually, many of those schools became universities. Monks in scriptoria copied texts of Greece and Rome, as well as religious texts, and kept these manuscripts from being lost during the Middle Ages.

Medicine
 Monastic pharmacies stored and studied medicaments. Some of the works that the monks copied were by medical writers, and reading and copying these works helped create a store of medical knowledge. Monasteries had infirmaries to treat the monks, travelers, the poor, old, weak and sick. In 2005, archeologists uncovered waste at Soutra Aisle which helped scientists figure out how people in the Middle Ages treated certain diseases, such as scurvy; because of the vitamin C in watercress, patients would eat it to stop their teeth from falling out. The same archeological group discovered hemlock, a known pain killer, in the drains of the hospital.

Monasteries also aided in the development of agricultural techniques. The requirement of wine for the Mass led to the development of wine culture, as shown in the discovery of the méthode champenoise by Dom Perignon. Several liquors like Bénédictine and the Trappist beers were also developed in monasteries. Even today many monasteries and convents are locally renowned for their cooking specialties.

The consequence of this centralisation of knowledge was that they initially controlled both public administration and education, where the trivium led through the quadrivium to theology. Christian monks cultivated the arts as a way of praising God. Gregorian chant and miniatures are examples of the practical application of quadrivium subjects.

The status of monks as apart from secular life (at least theoretically) also served a social function. Dethroned Visigothic kings were tonsured and sent to a monastery so that they could not claim the crown back. Monasteries became a place for second sons to live in celibacy so that the family inheritance went to the first son; in exchange the families donated to the monasteries. Few cities lacked both a St Giles house for lepers outside the walls and a Magdalene house for prostitutes and other women of notoriety within the walls, and some orders were favored by monarchs and rich families to keep and educate their maiden daughters before arranged marriage.

The monasteries also provided refuge to those like Charles V, Holy Roman Emperor who retired to Yuste in his late years, and his son Philip II of Spain, who was functionally as close to a monastic as his regal responsibilities permitted.

See also
 Asceticism
 Chronology of early Christian monasticism
 Clasau—the early Welsh monasteries
 Consensoria Monachorum
 Coptic monasticism
 Hermit
 Intentional community
 Into Great Silence—the award-winning documentary of life within the Carthusian monsastery of La Grande Chartreuse by Philip Groning
 List of monastic houses in England
 Mount Athos
 New Monasticism
 Order of Watchers—a French Protestant fraternity of Hermits
 Pachomius—an early example of a monastic organizer
 Poustinia
 Rule of St Benedict

Notes, references, and sources

References

Sources

External links
 Directory of Contemplative Men's Monasteries in the United States
 Directory of Contemplative Women's Monasteries in the United States
 "Catholic Hermitage" – Christian Perspective on Monasticism
 Eastern Christian Monasticism orthodoxinfo.com
 Anglican religious orders and communities Anglican information on monasticism
 Photographs of Christian Monasteries
 American Benedictine monastics
 Community of Jesus

 
Asceticism
Monasticism
Monasticism
Hesychasm
History of Catholic monasticism